The 2017 Bound for Glory was a professional wrestling pay-per-view (PPV) event produced by Impact Wrestling. It took place on November 5, 2017, at the Aberdeen Pavilion in Ottawa, Ontario. It was the thirteenth event under the Bound for Glory chronology, the second and last Impact pay-per-view event of 2017.

Due to Impact Wrestling's partnership with Mexican Promotion Lucha Libre AAA Worldwide (AAA), wrestlers from that promotion also appeared on the card, including El Hijo del Fantasma, Pagano (wrestler), El Texano Jr., Garza Jr., and Johnny Mundo also with Impact Wrestling's Partnership with Japanese Promotion Pro Wrestling Noah, wrestlers from that promotion also appeared on the card, including Taiji Ishimori and GHC Heavyweight Champion Eddie Edwards.

In October 2017, with the launch of the Global Wrestling Network, the event became available to stream on demand.

Storylines
Bound for Glory featured professional wrestling matches involving different wrestlers from pre-existing scripted feuds and storylines. Wrestlers portrayed villains, heroes, or less distinguishable characters in the scripted events that built tension and culminate in a wrestling match or series of matches.

On August 17, a video package was shown at Destination X revealing that Johnny Impact will be debuting for the company next week. On the August 24 episode of Impact!, he made his televised in-ring debut in a Gauntlet for the Gold match for the vacant Impact Global Championship, ending in the final three before being eliminated by eventual winner Eli Drake. The following week, Impact and Eddie Edwards interrupted Eli Drake's championship celebration, which led to a tag-team match on the main-event, which Drake and Chris Adonis won. On the September 14 episode of Impact!, Johnny Impact defeated Low Ki to become the number one contender to the Impact Global Championship at Victory Road. After the match, Drake and Adonis brutally attacked Impact. The following week, Impact defended his number one contender status in two matches, defeating both KM and Texano in the same night. At Victory Road, Impact was defeated by Drake and failed to win the Impact Global Championship. After the match, he was attacked by Drake and Adonis but was saved by Garza Jr. However, the two of them were assaulted by The Latin American Xchange. On the October 12 episode of Impact!, Impact defeated Garza in a number one contendership match to challenge Eli Drake for the Impact Global Championship at Bound for Glory.

It was announced that Impact Knockouts Champion Sienna would defend her title against Allie, Gail Kim, and Taryn Terrell. However, Terrell was pulled from the match due to leaving Impact. On November 4, 2017, it was announced that the scheduled match between Rosemary and Taya Valkyrie had been cancelled, due to unforeseen personal circumstances regarding Taya.

Reception

Bound for Glory received negative reviews by critics. Mike Johnson of PWInsider summarized Bound for Glory by writing that "Impact has their chance to make a statement but instead does the same old thing". This was referencing the "completely bullshit finish" of Alberto El Patrón's decisive interference in the "really, really good" Drake-Impact main event, which "was the same overbooked ending that we've seen in a ton of Impact main events dating back a decade plus" - despite those who were "blamed for these decisions in the past" (Vince Russo, Jeff Jarrett, or Dixie Carter) having left the company. Johnson felt this was a highly inappropriate way to treat "fans in a brand new market" and die-hard paying customers at Impact's "biggest show of the year."

Jason Powell of Pro Wrestling Dot Net described Bound for Glory as "a poor show with few redeeming qualities ... the new creative regime made a lousy first impression". Regarding the main event, Powell criticized the "bush league TNA finish" and "a chair shot to the head in 2017".

Mike McMahon of Pro Wrestling Torch wrote that Bound for Glory was "really bad ... 3/10 at most. There wasn't any matches that stood out as being great, and at the same time, a lot of it felt flat ... The booking on the show was below average, at best." Also, McMahon felt that it was "absolutely inexcusable to make El Patron the focal point of the company" given his "long history" of screwing up.

Adam Martin of Wrestleview wrote that "Bound for Glory disappoints in Ottawa" and that "the pacing of the show was really bad".

Larry Csonka of 411Mania rated the show a "bad" rating of 3/10. He wrote that although he wanted the show to be great, "highly questionable booking, some bad wrestling and mostly flat action with a crowd that died as the night went on" were reasons why the show failed to deliver. He would end his review stating "Nothing was special, nothing was memorable in a good way; this show failed its fans."

Results

See also

2017 in professional wrestling
Professional wrestling in Canada
Bound for Glory Series

References

External links

Bound for Glory (wrestling pay-per-view)
Events in Ottawa
2017 in Ontario
Professional wrestling in Ontario
November 2017 events in Canada
2017 Impact Wrestling pay-per-view events